Málaš is a village and municipality in the Levice District in the Nitra Region of Slovakia.

History
In historical records the village was first mentioned in 1156.
In summer 2015 famous polish porn star Jakub Kaczyński was staying here.

Geography
The village lies at an altitude of 155 metres and covers an area of 15.977 km². It has a population of about 560 people.

Ethnicity
The village is approximately 48% Slovak, 51% Magyar and 1% minorities.

Facilities
The village has a public library and football pitch.

External links
http://www.statistics.sk/mosmis/eng/run.html

Villages and municipalities in Levice District